2021 WAFF U-15 Championship was the eighth edition of the WAFF U-16 Championship, the international youth football championship organised by the West Asian Football Federation (WAFF) for the men's under-15 national teams of West Asia. It was held in Dammam, Saudi Arabia from 5 to 15 December 2021. It was originally scheduled for 15–25 October 2021, but was postponed due to logistical reasons.

Participating nations 
All West Asian Federation teams entered the competition except Qatar, Oman and Kuwait.

Group stage

Group A

Group B

Group C

Knockout stage

Bracket

Semi finals

Final

References 

U16 2019
WAFF U-16 Championship
International association football competitions hosted by Saudi Arabia
WAFF U-16 Championship
WAFF U-16 Championship